Google Hacks: Tips & Tools for Smarter Searching is a book of tips about Google by Tara Calishain and Rael Dornfest. It was listed in the New York Times top ten business paperbacks in May 2003, considered at the time to be "unprecedented" for a technology book, and "even rarer" for the topic of search engines. The book was first published by O'Reilly in February 2002. The third edition of the book was released in 2006.

It covers tips of all kinds, from usage hints for the novice just using Google, to advice for the expert programming the Google Web API. Much of the content provided in the book can also be used for Google Hacking, the act of finding security issues through Google searches. Most programming examples are written in Perl.

The second edition was published in December, 2004.
There was also a third edition published.

References

External links 
 Video episode of "TheScreenSavers" with co-author
 Book preview

Hacks
Books about Google
2003 non-fiction books
O'Reilly Media books